Niluvu Dopidi  is a 1968 Indian Telugu-language comedy drama film, produced by U. Visweswara Rao and directed by C. S. Rao. It stars N. T. Rama Rao, Krishna, Devika and Jayalalita, with music composed by K. V. Mahadevan. The film was released on 25 January 1968 and became a commercial success.

Plot 
Jagapathi Rayalu, the zamindar of the village Rangapuram, has two sons – Ramu and Krishna. Before dying, he entrusts their responsibility to his sisters Chukamma and Sheshamma. The avaricious Chukkamma ploys with her distant relative Bhushanam to kill the heirs for the property. However, the boys are rescued by Chukkamma's wise husband Venkataramaiah and they land at an orphanage. Years roll by, and Ramu turns into a mechanic whereas Krishna is a college student. They fall in love with the daughters of Sheshamma and Chukkamma: Janaki and Radha respectively.

At Rangapuram, Chukkamma reaps her benefits. Parallelly, Bhushanam becomes the president of the village who aspires to arrange his son Raju's marriage with Radha. Bhushanam learns of Radha and Krishna's love affair. So, he beats Krishna when enraged Ramu revolts on Bhushanam, but stops upon seeing the picture of the orphanage founder i.e. Jagapathi Rayalu. Soon after, their guardian Swamiji reveals the truth. Ramu and Krishna reach Rangapuram in disguise, brings Bhushanam to justice, and teach a lesson to Chukkamma. The film ends with the marriages of Ramu with Janaki, and Krishna with Radha.

Cast

Production 
After the success of the folklore film Kanchu Kota (1967), its producer U. Visweswara Rao and director C. S. Rao decided to make their next venture a contemporary film under the same banner Manjula Cine Syndicate. Kanchu Kotas lead actors N. T. Rama Rao and Devika were retained for the new film, titled Niluvu Dopidi. Visweswara Rao wrote the story which Tripuraneni Maharadhi, the film's screenwriter, read and noticed was strongly influenced by Gundamma Katha (1962). Maharadhi felt Visweswara Rao's story was outdated, so he reworked it to its final form. Visweswara Rao's initial choice for the second male lead was Sobhan Babu, but later chose Krishna at the insistence of Maharadhi, who felt he would match Rama Rao's "jubilance". J. Jayalalithaa was cast as the second female lead, paired alongside Krishna. Kanta Rao, who appeared in Kanchu Kota, was dismayed upon realising there was no role for him in Niluvu Dopidi and insisted on an appearance; he was offered to act as a minister and willingly accepted. The cinematography was handled by G. K. Ramu and the art direction by S. Krishna Rao, while editing was handled by R. Hanumantha Rao. The song "Aadapillalante Hoi Hoi", choreographed by Thangappa, was shot at the Madras-based Golden Studios in September 1967.

Soundtrack 
The soundtrack was composed by K. V. Mahadevan.

Release and reception 
Niluvu Dopidi was released on 25 January 1968 and became a commercial success.

References

External links 
 

1960s Telugu-language films
1968 comedy-drama films
1968 films
Films directed by C. S. Rao
Films scored by K. V. Mahadevan
Indian comedy-drama films